Grupo Editorial Vid (also known as Vid or Mundo Vid) was a Mexican comic, manga and books publisher. It was funded in the early 1940s as Editorial Argumentos (EDAR).
Many of their books are sold from around 30 pesos for comics up to 60 Pesos for manga (approximately US$5–6). Both comics and manga are released monthly.

Comics
In the mid 1990s, Vid started publishing Marvel Comics, DC Comics, and Image Comics, among others, as well as some independent titles. In 2005, when Televisa acquired the rights to publish Marvel titles they stopped selling it.
Published Marvel Titles:
 The Amazing Spider-Man
 Uncanny X-Men
 Ultimate Spider-Man
 Ultimate X-Men
 Avengers
 The Ultimates
 Secret Wars
 Infinity Gauntlet
 Marvel Mangaverse
 Marvels

DC Comics published and current titles:
 Superman
 Batman
 Wonder Woman
 Green Lantern
 Flash
 Crisis on Infinite Earths
 Infinite Crisis
 Justice
 JLA
 Superman/Batman
 All-Star Superman
 All-Star Batman and Robin the Boy Wonder
 DC vs Marvel
 JLA/Avengers
 Watchmen
 WildC.A.TS
 52

Image/Top Cow:
 Spawn
 Hellspawn
 Savage Dragon
 Tomb Raider

Dark Horse Titles:
 Hellboy
 Frank Miller's 300
 Star Wars

Bongo Comics:
 Simpsons Comics
 Bart Simpson's Treehouse of Horror

Mundo Vid Titles:
 Memin Pinguin, the first comic published.
 El Pantera
 Lágrimas y Risas franchise (firstly known as Lágrimas, risas y amor). Many of its stories has been adapted as soap operas (telenovelas) by Televisa TV network

Manga and Manhwa published by Vid

Future Manga and Manhwa releases
 Keroro
 FullMetal Alchemist
 Hellsing
 King of Hell
 Unbalance x Unbalance
 Chronicles of the Cursed Sword

External links
 Mundo Vid

Comic book publishing companies of Mexico
Manga distributors
Manhwa distributors